John Hart Jr. (1848–1881) was a member of the South Australian parliament from 1880 to 1881.

Hart was the third of seven children of Captain John Hart who was three times premier of South Australia between 1865 and 1871. He was senior member of J. Hart & Co., the business founded by his father.

In 1870, Hart became the inaugural president of the Port Adelaide Football Club, and "Buck's Flat", in his father's Glanville Hall Estate property, was the club's home and site of many matches in its early years. The club's inaugural secretary was the longtime manager of Hart's Mill, William Leicester. 
Hart was also president of the Port Adelaide Rifle Club and a prominent member of the Adelaide Hunt Club, serving as Master of Fox Hounds for the years 1873 and 1876.

He was elected to the seat of Port Adelaide in the House of Assembly in 1880 but died the following year prior to the end of his term. He died on 15 August 1881 at Wooton Lea, Glen Osmond.

Family
In 1877 he married Emily Lavinia Finch (died 5 October 1939) on 8 August 1877. Their children included:
John Heriot Hart (25 January 1880 – 1 March 1929) was a prominent musician.
Marian Henthorn Hart (15 June 1881 – 18 May 1942)

References

 

Members of the South Australian House of Assembly
Australian flour millers and merchants
1848 births
1881 deaths
19th-century Australian politicians
19th-century Australian businesspeople